Qadsiya is an area in Capital Governorate in Kuwait City, Kuwait. It was named after Battle of al-Qādisiyyah. According to the 2011 census, about 14,389 people live there.

References

Al Asimah Governorate (Kuwait)
Populated places in Kuwait